Forst is a municipality in the district of Karlsruhe in Baden-Württemberg, Germany. It is located on Bertha Benz Memorial Route 2 km north of Bruchsal and shares a direct border with that city.

1988 F-16C jet fighter crash

On March 31, 1988, a US Air Force F-16C jet fighter crashed into the town during a low-altitude exercise. After striking the roof of a house and badly damaging another, the aircraft slid down along the length of Forster Hardtstrasse, setting several houses on fire. The pilot,  24-year old Lt. Thomas Edward Doyle, and a resident, 62-year old Theo Huber, were killed.

References

Karlsruhe (district)